is a Japanese table tennis player.

Achievements
Women's singles

Women's doubles

References

1996 births
Japanese female table tennis players
Living people
Sportspeople from Kagawa Prefecture
Table tennis players at the 2018 Asian Games
People from Mitoyo, Kagawa
Nissay Red Elf players
Asian Games competitors for Japan